Permetter Branch is a  long 2nd order tributary to Brown Creek in Anson County, North Carolina.

Variant names
According to the Geographic Names Information System, it has also been known historically as:  
Palmetto Branch

Course
Permetter Branch rises about 0.5 miles west of Ansonville, North Carolina.  Permetter Branch then flows southeast to meet Brown Creek about 2 miles south of Ansonville, North Carolina.

Watershed
Permetter Branch drains  of area, receives about 47.8 in/year of precipitation, has a topographic wetness index of 452.68 and is about 50% forested.

References

Rivers of North Carolina
Rivers of Anson County, North Carolina
Tributaries of the Pee Dee River